Songs performed on the American television series Glee are listed in the following articles:
 List of songs in Glee (season 1)
 List of songs in Glee (season 2)
 List of songs in Glee (season 3)
 List of songs in Glee (season 4)
 List of songs in Glee (season 5)
 List of songs in Glee (season 6)